The 2006 Porsche Carrera Cup Deutschland season was the 21st German Porsche Carrera Cup season. It began on 9 April at Hockenheim and finished on 29 October at the same circuit, after nine rounds. It ran as a support championship for the 2006 DTM season. Dirk Werner won the championship beating Uwe Alzen by 11 points.

Teams and drivers

Race calendar and results

Championship standings

Drivers' championship

† — Drivers did not finish the race, but were classified as they completed over 90% of the race distance.

External links
The Porsche Carrera Cup Germany website
Porsche Carrera Cup Germany Online Magazine

Porsche Carrera Cup Germany seasons
Porsche Carrera Cup Germany